The second season of Tu cara me suena premiered on Univision and Las Estrellas on March 27, 2022. The series is the American Spanish-language version of the Endemol format Your Face Sounds Familiar. This season features eight celebrities that compete in a song and dance number while impersonating iconic singers. Ana Brenda Contreras and Rafael Araneda returned as hosts. Angélica Vale and Charytín Goyco returned to the judging panel. Edén Muñoz and Víctor Manuelle joined as judges, replacing Jesús Navarro and Kany García. On May 8, 2022, Michael Stuart was declared the winner of the season.

Judges

Contestants

Performances

Weekly results

Week 1: March 27

Week 2: April 3

Week 3: April 10

Week 4: April 17

Week 5: April 24

Semifinal: May 1

Final: May 8

Ratings

References 

Your Face Sounds Familiar